Téa Obreht (born Tea Bajraktarević; 30 September 1985) is an American novelist. She won the Orange Prize for Fiction in 2011 for The Tiger's Wife, her debut novel.

Biography
Téa Obreht was born as Tea Bajraktarević in the autumn of 1985, in Belgrade, SR Serbia, SFR Yugoslavia.

After graduating from the University of Southern California, Obreht received a MFA in fiction from the creative writing program at Cornell University in 2009.

Obreht's work has appeared in The New Yorker, Zoetrope: All-Story, Harpers, The New York Times and The Guardian, and in story anthologies.

Among many influences, Obreht has mentioned in press interviews the Colombian novelist Gabriel García Márquez, the Yugoslav Nobel Prize winner Ivo Andrić, Raymond Chandler, Ernest Hemingway, Isak Dinesen, Russian writer Mikhail Bulgakov, and the children's writer Roald Dahl.

The Tiger's Wife

The Tiger's Wife was published by Weidenfeld & Nicolson in 2010. It is a novel set in an unnamed Balkan country, in the present and half a century ago, and features a young doctor's relationship with her grandfather and the stories he tells her. These concern a "deathless man" who meets him several times in different places and never grows old, and a deaf-mute girl from his childhood village who befriends a tiger that escaped from a zoo. It was largely written while she was at Cornell, and excerpted in The New Yorker in June 2009. Asked to summarize it by a university journalist, Obreht replied, "It's a family saga that takes place in a fictionalized province of the Balkans. It's about a female narrator and her relationship to her grandfather, who's a doctor. It's a saga about doctors and their relationships to death throughout all these wars in the Balkans."

The Tiger's Wife won the British Orange Prize for Fiction in 2011 (for 2010 publications). Obreht was the youngest winner of the annual prize (established 1996), which recognizes "excellence, originality and accessibility in women's writing from throughout the world". Late in 2011 she was a finalist for that year's U.S. National Book Award for Fiction.

Bibliography

Novels

Short stories
 "The Laugh", The Atlantic, Fiction Issue (August 2009)
 "The Sentry", The Guardian, Summer Short Story Special (Summer 2010)

Essays and reporting
 "Twilight of The Vampires: Hunting the Real-Life Undead", Harper's Magazine (November 2010)

References

External links
Téa Obreht official website
Archive at The Atlantic

2011 radio interview (one hour) at The Bat Segundo Show
Tea Obreht Reads From Her Novel, 'The Tiger's Wife', PBS NewsHour, 1 April 2011
2011 Orange Prize Winner, Orange Prize for Fiction, 8 June 2011

  (one title)

Living people
1985 births
21st-century American novelists
21st-century American short story writers
21st-century women writers
American people of Bosniak descent
American people of Serbian descent
American people of Slovenian descent
American women novelists
American women short story writers
Cornell University alumni
Exophonic writers
People from Belgrade
Serbian emigrants to the United States
Serbian people of Bosniak descent
Serbian writers
The New Yorker people
Writers from New York (state)
Yugoslav emigrants to the United States